NightGowns is a television series featuring Sasha Velour that premiered on the mobile streaming service Quibi on April 6, 2020. Season one of the series consists of eight episodes, each of which focuses on one of the main cast members of Velour's NightGowns stage drag show.

On August 10, 2020, the series was renewed for a second season. However the future of the series is unknown due to the announcement of Quibi's shutdown in October 2020.

Episodes

References

2020 American television series debuts
2020s American LGBT-related television series
Drag (clothing) television shows
Quibi original programming